Jeremiah 20 is the twentieth chapter of the Book of Jeremiah in the Hebrew Bible or the Old Testament of the Christian Bible. This book contains prophecies attributed to the prophet Jeremiah, and is one of the Books of the Prophets. This chapter includes the fifth of the passages known as the "Confessions of Jeremiah".

Text 
The original text was written in Hebrew language. This chapter is divided into 18 verses.

Textual witnesses
Some early manuscripts containing the text of this chapter in Hebrew are of the Masoretic Text tradition, which includes the Codex Cairensis (895), the Petersburg Codex of the Prophets (916), Aleppo Codex (10th century), Codex Leningradensis (1008). Some fragments containing parts of this chapter were found among the Dead Sea Scrolls, i.e., 4QJera (4Q70; 225-175 BCE) with extant verses 14‑18, and 4QJerc (4Q72; 1st century BC) with extant verses 2‑9, 13‑15 (similar to Masoretic Text).

There is also a translation into Koine Greek known as the Septuagint, made in the last few centuries BCE. Extant ancient manuscripts of the Septuagint version include Codex Vaticanus (B; B; 4th century), Codex Sinaiticus (S; BHK: S; 4th century), Codex Alexandrinus (A; A; 5th century) and Codex Marchalianus (Q; Q; 6th century).

Parashot
The parashah sections listed here are based on the Aleppo Codex. Jeremiah 20 is a part of the Seventh prophecy (Jeremiah 18-20) in the section of Prophecies of Destruction (Jeremiah 1-25). {P}: open parashah; {S}: closed parashah.
 [{S} 19:15] 20:1-3 {S} 20:4-6 {P} 20:7-12 {S} 20:13 {S} 20:14-18

Altercation with Pashhur (20:1–6)

Verse 1
Now Pashur the son of Immer the priest, who was also chief governor in the house of the Lord, heard that Jeremiah prophesied these things. 
 "Pashhur, the son of Immer", leader of the "Temple police", publicly struck Jeremiah (verse 2; KJV: "smote"), earning a prophecy of doom with the new name "" (Jeremiah 20:3). Pottery shards with the name Pashhur written on it were unearthed at Tel Arad in the 1970s, and this so-called "Tel Arad Ostraca" may refer to the same individual mentioned in this verse.
 "Chief governor" (from): or "deputy governor", that is, a person overseeing "the temple, temple guards, entry into the court and so on" and must be a priest. The nagid, or "governor", of the temple was the high priest, the office held at that time by Seraiah the high priest, the grandson of Hilkiah (or possibly still his father, Azariah, Hilkiah's son and Jeremiah's brother, ; Ezra 7:1), and Pashhur was his  (or pakid; "deputy"; cf. : God appointed Jeremiah, "set thee over" - literally, "have made thee ").

Verse 2
Then Pashur smote Jeremiah the prophet, and put him in the stocks that were in the high gate of Benjamin, which was by the house of the Lord.
The Jerusalem Bible treats Jeremiah's altercation with Passhur as part of the narrative of the broken jug in chapter 19.

Verse 3
And it came to pass on the morrow, that Pashur brought forth Jeremiah out of the stocks. Then said Jeremiah unto him, The Lord hath not called thy name Pashur, but Magormissabib.
"Magormisabib": transliterated from Hebrew:  ("terror on every side" or "fear on every side"; in this verse;), is a new name given to Pashhur, the son of Immer, after he struck Jeremiah the prophet, as prophecy that Pashhur would share the fate of Jerusalem's inhabitants who were taken into the exile.

Jeremiah’s Unpopular Ministry (20:7–18)
This is the final section of the Confessions of Jeremiah.

See also

Related Bible parts: Deuteronomy 25, Job 3, Psalm 31, Jeremiah 6

References

Sources

External links

Jewish
Jeremiah 20 Hebrew with Parallel English

Christian
Jeremiah 20 English Translation with Parallel Latin Vulgate

20